Rob Base & DJ E-Z Rock were an American hip hop duo from Harlem, New York City. Rob Base is the stage name of Robert Ginyard (b. 1967) and DJ E-Z Rock was Rodney "Skip" Bryce (1967–2014). They are best known for the 1988 hit "It Takes Two", a single that was a top 40 hit and has been certified platinum by the RIAA. That song was a part of the duo's album of the same name, which also has been certified platinum. They are known for being pioneers of the crossover success that rap music would have in the popular music mainstream.

Career 
The duo's first U.S. single and release was "DJ Interview", appearing on World to World, which later got them a recording contract with Profile Records in 1987. The duo was assisted by a long time friend from New Jersey, producer David Wynn. David Wynn produced three songs on their debut album and five songs on their sophomore album.

The first Profile release was "It Takes Two". It used multiple samples from the James Brown and Lyn Collins 1972 song "Think (About It)". The track first became a regional hit and then slowly climbed the Billboard Hot 100, picking up a multi-platinum single certification. The song also peaked at No. 3 on the Hot Dance Music/Club Play chart.

An album, also called It Takes Two, was quickly put together and it produced a significant follow-up hit, "Joy and Pain", which sampled a song of the same name by Maze featuring Frankie Beverly, as well as "Put the Music Where Your Mouth Is" by The Olympic Runners. It also hit the top 10 on the dance chart and climbed to No. 58 on the Hot 100. "Get On the Dance Floor", produced by David Wynn (DJ Wynn), a track released to clubs in between the two singles, hit No. 1 on the Hot Dance Music/Club Play chart in 1989. Boosted by those singles, the It Takes Two album went platinum seven times over.

Base responded in 1989 with The Incredible Base, his debut solo album. It did not sell as well as It Takes Two. One song from the album hit the dance chart in late 1989: "Turn It Out (Go Base)", credited only to Rob Base.

In 2008, their song "It Takes Two" was ranked number 37 on VH1's 100 greatest songs of hip hop.

Personal lives 
Rob Base, born Robert Ginyard on May 18, 1967, was born and raised in Harlem. He attended Harlem public schools and loved music. Influenced by rap, he began his journey and performed in talent shows and at as many open mic or hip-hop events as he could. His first child, De'Jené Ginyard, was born in 1989 to his then-girlfriend Rhonda Dunbar, with whom he was in a relationship from 1986 to 1990. In 1991, Base met April, and in 1992, they had a son, Robert Ginyard Jr. They subsequently took guardianship of April's cousin Dysell. Base and April married and remained together until her death in September 2013.

DJ E-Z Rock died on April 27, 2014 at age 46 after a diabetic seizure.

Discography

Studio albums

Singles

References

External links 
 
 Rob's Official justRHYMES.com profile – music, bio, videos & more
 Maxim.com Rap Public Service Announcement featuring Rob Base

African-American musical groups
American musical duos
Hip hop duos
Hip hop groups from New York City
Hip house music groups
Musical groups established in 1985
Musical groups disestablished in 2014
Profile Records artists
1985 establishments in New York City